The Kingdom of Paiyun was a petty kingdom in the confederation of 24 states known as Chaubisi Rajya.

References 

Chaubisi Rajya
Paiyun
Paiyun
History of Nepal
Paiyun